Li Wing Mui (Chinese: 李詠梅; Jyutping: lei5 wing6 mui4; Pinyin: Lǐ Yǒngméi) (born 19 September 1979) is a badminton player from Hong Kong.

She competed in badminton at the 2004 Summer Olympics in women's doubles with partner Koon Wai Chee.  They were defeated by Gail Emms and Donna Kellogg of Great Britain in the round of 32. In 2002 she won her first title at the Hong Kong National Badminton Championships.

References

 Li Wing Mui at Sports Reference

Hong Kong female badminton players
Badminton players at the 2004 Summer Olympics
1979 births
Living people
Asian Games medalists in badminton
Badminton players at the 2002 Asian Games
Asian Games bronze medalists for Hong Kong
Medalists at the 2002 Asian Games
Olympic badminton players of Hong Kong